The Kunua blind snake (Acutotyphlops kunuaensis) is a species of snake in the Typhlopidae family. It is endemic to the island of Bougainville.

References

Acutotyphlops
Reptiles described in 1995
Natural history of Bougainville Island